Competitor for  Canada
 

Benjamin Jamieson (March 15, 1874 - December 3, 1915) was a Canadian lacrosse player who competed in the 1904 Summer Olympics. In 1904, he was a member of the Shamrock Lacrosse Team which won the gold medal in the lacrosse tournament.

References

External links
 Benjamin Jamieson profile at Sports Reference.com

1874 births
1915 deaths
Canadian lacrosse players
Lacrosse players at the 1904 Summer Olympics
Olympic gold medalists for Canada
Olympic lacrosse players of Canada
Medalists at the 1904 Summer Olympics
Olympic medalists in lacrosse
20th-century Canadian people